Thomas Robertson  (c.1745–15 November 1799) was an 18th-century Scottish minister and historian who co-founded the Royal Society of Edinburgh in 1783.

Life

He studied divinity at the University of Edinburgh and was licensed to preach by the Church of Scotland in 1775, marrying Jane Jackson in the same year. He was minister first in Lauder then in Dalmeny.

He died in Dalmeny on 15 November 1799.

Publications

The History of Mary Queen of Scots (1795)

References

1799 deaths
Alumni of the University of Edinburgh
18th-century Ministers of the Church of Scotland
18th-century Scottish historians
Fellows of the Royal Society of Edinburgh
Year of birth uncertain